Kalli may refer to:

People
 Kalli (name), including a list of people with the surname and given name
 Karl-Heinz Feldkamp (b. 1934), German retired football manager, known as Kalli

Places
 Kalli, Pärnu County, Estonia
 Kalli, Saare County, Estonia
 Lake Kalli, in Estonia
 Kalli station, in Pyongyang, North Korea
 Kalli Station (pastoral lease), a cattle and sheep station in Western Australia

See also

Kalai (disambiguation)
Kalali (disambiguation)
Kali (disambiguation)
Kall (disambiguation)
Kallio (disambiguation)
Karli (disambiguation)
Kali, a Hindu goddess